The Dairy Diversion Program is a voluntary supply control program authorized by the Dairy Production Stabilization Act of 1983 (P.L. 98-180, Title I) of United States, under which producers in 1984-85 received payments of $10/cwt. of milk, for reducing their milk marketings by between 5% to 30% below an earlier base period.

References 

United States Department of Agriculture programs